Sakowitz was a chain of family-owned department stores based in Houston, Texas, United States. The store was founded by two brothers, Tobias and Simon Sakowitz, in Galveston, Texas in 1902 as a gentlemen's haberdashery. Other family members were working in the cotton mills in Galveston. Their father, Louis Sakowitz, had begun a peddler business, taking orders and delivering clothes on a bicycle to the many merchant seamen in Galveston in 1886. Eventually, the chain expanded to 16 locations, of which 14 were in Texas, one in Arizona and another in Oklahoma. Sakowitz was responsible for launching many of the now-famous European fashion designers in America - among them Andre' Courreges, Yves St. Laurent Rive Gauche, Zandra Rhoades, Givenchy, and Erminegildo Zegna. The Sakowitz catalogues were mailed to all fifty states and abroad.
 
L. J. Hooker, an Australian retail development firm, joint ventured an exit from Chapter 11 restructuring the Sakowitz chain in 1987, and opened at Forest Fair Mall (now Forest Fair Village) in Forest Park, Ohio and Fairfield, Ohio. Due, in part, to the fact that Cincinnati was an untested market, the mall straddled two counties (Hamilton and Butler) and that the Australian real estate market tanked, Forest Fair Mall failed. The location of the complex was also in a very middle-class area and having both high and low end stores reside in the same mall proved to be too much.

The Sakowitz chain was liquidated in 1990 and its stores closed, along with other Hooker acquired stores Bonwit-Teller and B. Altmann, both chains of New York City. The Sakowitz name has survived in the form of Sakowitz Furs, a fur dealer with one store in Houston, owned by Jerry Gronauer.

History

Sakowitz was founded by brothers Tobias and Simon Sakowitz, the sons of an Eastern European Jewish immigrant, in 1902. The first location was in Galveston, Texas, with a second following in Houston, Texas fifteen years later. The location in Galveston was closed in 1917 and consolidated into the Houston store.

By 1929, the original Houston store on 308 Main Street had relocated to the Gulf Building at 720 Main Street; this store was subsequently relocated even further down Main Street. Eventually, the chain grew to several locations throughout Houston, including a suburban location at Westheimer Road at Post Oak and one in Nassau Bay across from NASA. With the increasing popularity of shopping malls, several mall-based locations were also added, including one each in the states of Arizona and Oklahoma. By the late 1980s, however, Sakowitz had scaled back operations, closing all but the Houston stores.

Purchase by L. J. Hooker

In the late 1980s, Australian developer L. J. Hooker proposed an upscale mall in suburban Cincinnati, Ohio, to be named Forest Fair Mall. Hooker's plans called for Sakowitz to be one of the mall's anchor stores, along with B. Altman and Bonwit Teller, two upscale chains based in New York City. In 1988, Hooker purchased controlling interest in all three chains so that they could open locations at the new mall; however, the chains proved too upscale for the Cincinnati market, and were subsequently sold off.

The Sakowitz chain was then auctioned off by L. J. Hooker, and all other locations were closed as well. The only remnant of the Sakowitz name is a Sakowitz Furs shop located in Houston, which is owned by Jerry Gronauer.

References

External links

Sakowitz Furs
About Sakowitz Furs
Gonzalez, J.R. "Ever shopped at Sakowitz?." Houston Chronicle. December 18, 2009.

Retail companies established in 1902
Companies based in Houston
Defunct department stores based in Texas
Defunct companies based in Texas
1902 establishments in Texas
Retail companies disestablished in 1990
1990 disestablishments in Texas